The Tati River is a river in northeast Botswana, a tributary of the Shashe River, which in turn is a tributary of the Limpopo River.
The river flows through Francistown, where it is joined by the Ntshe (or Inchwe) River from the left.

History

About 1865 a hunter came across traces of old gold diggings near the Tati. In 1869 the Englishman Daniel Francis came to hunt for gold on the river, before heading south to the Kimberley diamond fields in 1870. The gold was hard to extract, and the gold rush died down. Francis returned in 1880 and obtained mining rights from King Lobengula. Mining activity revived in the 1880s and 1890s, and Francistown was established in 1897 when the railway arrived. The town was named after Francis, who owned most of the land in the area.

Use

The sandy bed of the Tati river holds water only for a few days in each year, as is common with rivers in Botswana.
The dam, commissioned in 2008, supplies water to villages throughout the North East District.
Lower down the river supplies the Dikgatlhong Dam.

The water has become polluted from industrial and human waste, and there is a risk of cholera if the water is used untreated.
During the extended dry season, the river loses its surface water, although water may remain in the sand bed.
Mining of this sand has caused the water table to drop, and may also contribute to flooding.

References
Citations

Sources

 

Rivers of Botswana